Henry Horne (fl. 1400 - 1434) was an English politician.

Life
The Hornes were a prominent Kent family, around Horne's Place, near Appledore, Kent.

Horne had at least one son, the soldier and MP, Robert Horne, and a daughter, Joan Horne, who married William Haute.

Career
Horne was Member of Parliament for Kent October 1404. He was appointed sheriff of Kent for 1406–1407. However, his name has been recorded as 'Michael'.

Death
There is no definite record of Horne being alive after 1434.

References

People from Appledore, Kent
High Sheriffs of Kent
Year of birth missing
Year of death missing
14th-century births
1430s deaths
English MPs October 1404